Pink's War was an air-to-ground bombardment and strafing campaign carried out by the Royal Air Force, under the command of Wing Commander Richard Pink, against the mountain strongholds of Mahsud tribesmen in South Waziristan in March and April 1925. It was the first independent action by the RAF, and remains the only campaign named after an RAF officer.

Background

The defence of the North-West Frontier Province was an important task for British India. In the 1920s, the British were engaged in a continuing effort to defend British Indian Army bases against raids from militant tribesmen in the province. In July 1924, the British mounted operations against several of the Mahsud tribes in southern Waziristan and by October most tribes had ceased their activities. Only the Abdur Rahman Khel tribe and three other supporting tribes continued to attack army posts.

Operations

After the successful use of aerial bombardment in the Fifth Expedition of Somaliland campaign in 1920, the fledgling RAF was keen to further establish its military credentials. British forces had conducted operations against Mahsud tribes in Waziristan from July 1924, leaving only the Abdur Rahman Khel tribe and a few other tribes still engaged in activity by October 1924. The air officer commanding in India, Sir Edward Ellington, made the unprecedented decision to conduct air operations against the tribesmen without the support of the army. No. 2 (India) Wing, under the command of Wing Commander Richard Pink at Risalpur, was assigned to conduct the operation.

Bristol F.2B Fighters of No. 5 Squadron were deployed to the operational headquarters at Tank airstrip, with de Havilland DH.9As from 27 and 60 squadrons deployed to a forward operating base at Miranshah. Operations commenced on 9 March 1925, and following an initial sortie to drop warning leaflets on the targeted areas, the RAF squadrons strafed tribal mountain strongholds in a successful attempt to crush the rebellion. Operations focused on causing disruption to day-to-day activities for the militant tribes, as well as preventing access to safe havens; sorties were flown at night as well as during the day, in order to cause further disruption.

On 1 May 1925, after just over 50 days of bombing, the tribal leaders sought peace to end the bombing, bringing the short campaign to a close. Only two British lives and one aircraft were lost during the campaign; Mahsud casualties are not known. Pink's War was the first air action of the RAF carried out independent of the British Army or Royal Navy.

Honours
After the campaign was over, the India General Service Medal with the Waziristan 1925 bar was awarded to the 46 officers and 214 men of the Royal Air Force who took part in Pink's War. It was by far the rarest bar given with an India General Service Medal, and was only awarded after the then-Chief of the Air Staff Sir John Salmond succeeded in overturning the War Office decision not to grant a medal for the campaign. The campaign's commander, Wing Commander Pink, after whom the action became named, soon received a promotion to group captain "in recognition of his services in the field of Waziristan". For distinguished service during Pink's War, Squadron Leader Arthur John Capel was awarded the Distinguished Service Order, the Distinguished Flying Cross was awarded to flight lieutenants John Baker and William Cumming, and Flying Officer Reginald Pyne, and the Distinguished Flying Medal was given to sergeant pilots George Campbell and Ralph Hawkins, Sergeant Arthur Rutherford, Corporal Reginald Robins, and Leading Aircraftman William Alfred Walmsley. A further 14 men were mentioned in dispatches, including flying officers Edward Dashwood and Noel Hayter-Hames, who both died in the campaign.

See also 
Bacha Khan
Mirzali Khan
Mullah Powindah

References

Further reading

Air Power Review – Volume 13 Number 3 Autumn/Winter 2010 – Pink’s War – Applying the Principles of Air Control to Waziristan – Lieutenant Colonel Andrew Roe

External links
The Small Wars at the Royal Air Force official website

Airstrikes conducted by the United Kingdom
Waziristan
Military history of Khyber Pakhtunkhwa
1925 in India
Conflicts in 1925